Hirnyk is a city in Selydove municipality, Donetsk Oblast (province) of Ukraine. Population: ; 14,207 (2001). It is located on Vovcha River on a western slope of the Donets Ridge.

The city was established in 1958 in place of a miner settlement Sotsmistechko that existed since 1938 when around Kurakhove were built several mines. Soon after construction of the Kurakhivka No.40 mine, at the end of 1938 the DonbasZhytlobud construction trust has built first 60 one-storey residential buildings. On 15 January 1939 the settlement accounted for 860 people. By summer of 1941 there were about 5,000 people. In 1939 there was built an elementary school, outpatient clinic, recreational club, and two stores.

With the start of the World War II and advancing Nazi Germany forces, both built mines were blown by local communists and most of population that has not been mobilized was evacuated to Karaganda. The city was taken by the Nazi German forces on 20 October 1941. During occupation, the city was able to restore both ruined mines and finish the third one. There also existed small underground resistance group of local communists, but several of them in summer of 1942 were blown at a mine field.

On 8 September 1943 Sotsmistechko was liberated by couple of regiments of the 257th Rifle Division.

On 27 September 1958 Sotsmistechko was merged with its neighboring settlements (Prommaidanchyk, Zhovtneve, Peremoha, Pershotravneve, Komsomolske) into the city of Hirnyk. By that time in city were operating a cinder block factory, a complex in production of construction materials, bread factory, non-alcoholic drinks factory, a division of the construction holding "Artemzhytlobud". In 1969 in the city was built a bus inter-city station.

The city has two coal mines: Kurakhivska and Hirnyk (deactivated). Both mines are part of the state enterprise "Selydovvuhillia".

From it through the city railways stretch to the Kurakhove group of mines.

References

Cities in Donetsk Oblast
Populated places established in the Ukrainian Soviet Socialist Republic
Cities of district significance in Ukraine
1938 establishments in Ukraine
Populated places established in 1938
Mining cities and regions in Ukraine
Pokrovsk Raion